The 1997–98 NBA season was the 30th season for the Seattle SuperSonics in the National Basketball Association. In the off-season, the Sonics acquired All-Star forward Vin Baker from the Milwaukee Bucks in a three-team trade. The team also re-acquired former Sonics star and sharp shooter Dale Ellis from the Denver Nuggets, and signed free agents Jerome Kersey, and Greg Anthony. The Sonics got off to a fast start with a 13–3 record after a 7-game winning streak in November, despite losing Kersey to a stress fracture in his left foot as he only played just 37 games. The team posted an 8-game winning streak between December and January winning 29 of their first 35 games, then later on holding the league's best record before the All-Star break with a 37–10 record. as they finished first place in the Pacific Division tied with the Los Angeles Lakers with a 61–21 record.

Baker averaged 19.2 points and 8.0 rebounds per game, while Gary Payton averaged 19.2 points, 8.3 assists and 2.3 steals per game, and was named to the All-NBA First Team, and the NBA All-Defensive First Team. Baker and Payton were both selected for the 1998 NBA All-Star Game, with head coach George Karl coaching the Western Conference. In addition, Detlef Schrempf provided the team with 15.8 points, 7.1 rebounds and 4.4 assists per game, while Ellis played a sixth man role, averaging 11.8 points per game off the bench, while shooting .464 in three-point field goal percentage, and Hersey Hawkins contributed 10.5 points and 1.8 steals per game. Sam Perkins contributed 7.2 points per game off the bench, and starting center Jim McIlvaine led the team with 1.8 blocks per game. Payton finished in third place in Most Valuable Player voting, while Baker finished in eighth place. Payton also finished in second place in Defensive Player of the Year voting, and Ellis finished in third place in Sixth Man of the Year voting.

In the Western Conference First Round of the playoffs, the Sonics struggled as they trailed 2–1 to the 7th-seeded Minnesota Timberwolves, but managed to win the series in five games. In the Western Conference Semi-finals, the Sonics faced the 3rd-seeded Lakers, winning Game 1 at home, 106–92. However, they would lose the next four games to the Lakers, thus the series.

Two weeks after their elimination, Karl was fired as head coach in late May, then was hired three months later by the Milwaukee Bucks, while long-time Sonics guard Nate McMillan retired after only playing just 18 games this season due to knee surgery. Also following the season, Perkins signed as a free agent with the Indiana Pacers, while Kersey signed with the San Antonio Spurs, Anthony signed with the Portland Trail Blazers, McIlvaine was traded to the New Jersey Nets, and David Wingate signed with the New York Knicks.

Draft picks

Roster

Regular season

Season standings

Record vs. opponents

Game log

Playoffs

|- align="center" bgcolor="#ccffcc"
| 1
| April 24
| Minnesota
| W 108–83
| Vin Baker (25)
| Vin Baker (12)
| Gary Payton (7)
| KeyArena17,072
| 1–0
|- align="center" bgcolor="#ffcccc"
| 2
| April 26
| Minnesota
| L 93–98
| Gary Payton (32)
| Detlef Schrempf (10)
| Nate McMillan (6)
| KeyArena17,072
| 1–1
|- align="center" bgcolor="#ffcccc"
| 3
| April 28
| @ Minnesota
| L 90–98
| Gary Payton (26)
| Vin Baker (12)
| three players tied (5)
| Target Center19,006
| 1–2
|- align="center" bgcolor="#ccffcc"
| 4
| April 30
| @ Minnesota
| W 92–88
| Payton, Hawkins (24)
| Vin Baker (12)
| Gary Payton (8)
| Target Center19,006
| 2–2
|- align="center" bgcolor="#ccffcc"
| 5
| May 2
| Minnesota
| W 97–84
| Gary Payton (29)
| Detlef Schrempf (11)
| three players tied (4)
| KeyArena17,072
| 3–2
|-

|- align="center" bgcolor="#ccffcc"
| 1
| May 4
| L.A. Lakers
| W 106–92
| Gary Payton (25)
| Hawkins, Baker (8)
| Gary Payton (6)
| KeyArena17,072
| 1–0
|- align="center" bgcolor="#ffcccc"
| 2
| May 6
| L.A. Lakers
| L 68–92
| Vin Baker (13)
| Detlef Schrempf (8)
| Gary Payton (5)
| KeyArena17,072
| 1–1
|- align="center" bgcolor="#ffcccc"
| 3
| May 8
| @ L.A. Lakers
| L 103–119
| Detlef Schrempf (26)
| Vin Baker (12)
| Gary Payton (13)
| Great Western Forum17,505
| 1–2
|- align="center" bgcolor="#ffcccc"
| 4
| May 10
| @ L.A. Lakers
| L 100–112
| Gary Payton (31)
| Gary Payton (8)
| Gary Payton (13)
| Great Western Forum17,505
| 1–3
|- align="center" bgcolor="#ffcccc"
| 5
| May 12
| L.A. Lakers
| L 95–110
| Vin Baker (28)
| Vin Baker (9)
| Hersey Hawkins (6)
| KeyArena17,072
| 1–4
|-

Player statistics

NOTE: Please write the players statistics in alphabetical order by last name.

Season

Playoffs

Awards and records

Awards
 Gary Payton, All-NBA First Team
 Gary Payton, NBA All-Defensive First Team

Records

Transactions

Trades

Free agents

Additions

Subtractions

See also
 1997–98 NBA season

References

Seattle SuperSonics seasons